The 2019 Spielberg FIA Formula 3 round was a motor racing event held on 29 and 30 June 2019 at the Red Bull Ring in Austria. It is the third round of the 2019 FIA Formula 3 Championship, and ran in support of the 2019 Austrian Grand Prix.

Summary

Background
Following the opening round, Russian driver Robert Shwartzman leads the championship by twelve points over team-mate Jehan Daruvala, with Prema's third driver Marcus Armstrong sitting a further thirteen points behind the Indian.

Jenzer Motorsport would enter Italian F4 Championship driver Giorgio Carrara in their third car after it was left unoccupied in France following the departure of Artem Petrov.

Classification

Qualifying

 – Andres and Deledda received a five-place grid penalty each for ignoring Full Course Yellow.
 – Lundgaard and Beckmann were excluded from qualifying after it was discovered unauthorized personnel were working on their cars in the pit-lane.

Race 1

 – Tsunoda was awarded a five-second penalty for causing a collision.

References

External links
Official website

|- style="text-align:center"
|width="35%"|Previous race:
|width="30%"|FIA Formula 3 Championship2019 season
|width="40%"|Next race:

Spielberg
Formula 3
Auto races in Austria